The Yukon Scotties Tournament of Hearts is the women's territorial championship for women's curling in the Yukon. Beginning in 2015, the event serves as a direct qualifier to the Scotties Tournament of Hearts, Canada's national women's curling championships. Prior to 2015, the event served as a qualifier for the Yukon/NWT Scotties Tournament of Hearts.

Winners (2015–present)

Winners (2002–2014)

References

Scotties Tournament of Hearts provincial tournaments
Curling in Yukon